Majlis al-Nuwwab, literally Assembly of Deputies, is used in a number of countries as the Arabic-language name for the lower, directly elected house of a bicameral legislature. As a closer parallel to the idea of representative democracy, it is usually contrasted against the Tradition of Majlis al Shura (council of consultants, usually more associated with non-legislative assemblies of advisors to a ruler or, more recently, the upper houses of bicameral parliaments). 

The word is used as the official name of the following:
 Chamber of Deputies of Jordan
 Council of Representatives of Bahrain
 Assembly of Representatives of Yemen
 Parliament of Lebanon (also known as the National Assembly)
 Chamber of Deputies of Tunisia
 Council of Representatives of Iraq
 Assembly of Representatives of Morocco

Arabic words and phrases